The R J Peters Stakes is a  Perth Racing Group 3 Thoroughbred horse race held under quality handicap conditions, for horses aged three years old and upwards, over a distance of 1500 metres at Ascot Racecourse, Perth, Western Australia in November. Total prize money is A$150,000.

History
 The race was not held during World War II.
 In 2003 the race was run over 1600 metres at Belmont Park Racecourse.
 The race is named in honour of Bob Peters, one of Western Australia’s leading owner-breeders of thoroughbred racehorses.

1953 racebook

Name
1905–1983 - WATC Plate
1984–1986 - Budget Quality Cup
1987–1994 - Quality Stakes
1995–1998 - WATC Stakes
1999 onwards - R.J. Peters Stakes

Grade
1905–1978 - Principal race
1979–1985 - Listed race
1986 onwards - Group 3

Distance
1905–1971 - 6 furlongs (~1200 metres)
1972–1978 – 1200 metres
1979–1997 – 1400 metres
1998–2002 – 1500 metres
 2003 – 1600 metres
2004 onwards - 1500 metres

Winners

2021 - Kissonallforcheeks
2020 - Truly Great
2019 - Mississippi Delta
2018 - Freo
2017 - Properantes
2016 - Scales Of Justice
2015 - Hazzabeel
2014 - Bass Strait
2013 - Kerrific
2012 - Maschino
2011 - Westriver Kevydonn
2010 - God Has Spoken
2009 - Elliotto
2008 - Famous Roman
2007 - El Presidente
2006 - Always A Devil
2005 - Rescuer
2004 - Finito
2003 - Modem
2002 - Kensyl Bay
2001 - Old Fashion
2000 - Northerly
1999 - Sister Patricia
1998 - All The Aces
1997 - Jacks Or Better
1996 - Bold Extreme
1995 - Quadripedante
1994 - Sammy The Bull
1993 - Classy Dresser
1992 - Vows
1991 - Future Edition
1990 - Jungle Hero
1989 - Dual's Brute
1988 - Bowie
1987 - Denim Dancer
1986 - Western Pago
1985 - Haulpak's Image
1984 - Eastern Temple
1983 - Argentine Gold
1982 - Heron Bridge
1981 - Cordroy
1980 - Tulip Town
1979 - Embasadora         
1978 - Prince Brighton    
1977 - Belinda's Star     
1976 - Venetian Princess  
1975 - Good Morgan        
1974 - Merry Heart        
1973 - Starglow           
1972 - Acello             
1971 - Royal Spring       
1970 - My Juliet          
1969 - Cantanof           
1968 - Fair Dollar        
1967 - El Nisir           
1966 - Tudor Mak          
1965 - Port Jackson       
1964 - Norval Boy         
1963 - Norval Boy         
1962 - Count Sputnik      
1961 - Count Sputnik      
1960 - Olympiad           
1959 - race not held      
1958 - race not held      
1957 - Pegulara           
1956 - Craghill           
1955 - Sanfinilo          
1954 - In Reference       
1953 - Kola Cheval        
1952 - Copper Beech       
1951 - Shining Star       
1950 - Beau Glory         
1949 - Zanni              
1948 - Prince San         
1947 - Blue Stream        
1946 - Irish Myth         
1945 - Dear Brutus        
1944 - race not held      
1943 - race not held      
1942 - race not held      
1941 - race not held      
1940 - Atorna             
1939 - Byronic            
1938 - Amalette           
1937 - Tetreen            
1936 - Gay Gipsy          
1935 - Gay Gipsy                       
1934 - Old Story          
1933 - Esmeroic           
1932 - Alienist           
1931 - Green Laddie       
1930 - Einga              
1929 - Einga              
1928 - Prince Paladin     
1927 - Tea Lady           
1926 - Perfect Juggins    
1925 - Faucon             
1924 - Borgia             
1923 - Jolly Handsome     
1922 - Ayrlove            
1921 - True Moon          
1920 - Susarion           
1919 - Heart Of Oak       
1918 - Haud               
1917 - Headwind           
1916 - High Gate          
1915 - Adaleila           
1914 - Bullie B           
1913 - Galtee Princess    
1912 - Owlet              
1911 - Golden Orb         
1910 - Katoomba           
1909 - Thigen Thu         
1908 - Comatawah          
1907 - Enchanteur         
1906 - Attitude           
1905 - Rustaff

See also

 List of Australian Group races
 Group races

References

Horse races in Australia
Sport in Perth, Western Australia